Çamlıçatak is a village in the Ardahan District, Ardahan Province, Turkey. Its population is 882 (2021). It is situated in the high plateau of Eastern Anatolia.

References

Villages in Ardahan District